Elections in Jersey take place for the States Assembly and at parish-level. Various parties have been formed over the years in Jersey, but few candidates stand for election affiliated to any political party. All elections in Jersey use the first-past-the-post voting system. In 2008, the voting age was reduced to 16 years.

National elections
Jersey elects a legislature. From November 2011, the States Assembly has 51 elected members: 10 Senators (elected on an island-wide basis), 29 Deputies (elected in single- and multi-seat constituencies) and 12 Connétables (heads of the parishes).

The normal term of office for elected States Members is four years, though members elected in October 2011 and October 2014 will serve for shorter periods. From 2018, elections will be held in May every fourth year.

Senators
The office of Senator was created in 1948. In the early years of Senatorial elections since 1948, parish loyalties meant that votes would swing around the candidates, with Saint Helier - the largest and last parish to declare - often deciding the election. Since the 1980s, parish loyalties to local candidates have faded in favour of Islandwide issues and it is usual for the pattern of winning candidates to be clear from the first declarations, with "Town" voters in St Helier only likely to decide the last-placed candidate. Initially, Senators served terms of nine years but this was reduced to six years in 1966 and to four years in 2011.

The number of Senators will be reduced to eight in the October 2014 elections. As part of the transitional arrangements for this new electoral system, the six Senators elected for six-year terms in 2008 did not face election in 2011.

Up to the 2008 elections, six of the 12 Senatorial seats fell vacant every three years in elections held in October. Deputies had three year terms, with elections held in November. Defeated Senatorial candidates were therefore able to stand in the following Deputorial elections. It was not uncommon for an incumbent Senator denied re-election by the Island electorate to seek a refreshed mandate in their own parish. A number of prospective candidates for Deputy used the preceding Senatorials as a dry-run to either raise their public profile or, in the absence of a strong tie to one particular parish, to see which Deputorial constituency gave them the highest Senatorial vote. There was no uniform date for Connétable elections.

To be nominated for Senator, a candidate must secure a nomination paper signed by 10 validly-registered voters, including a proposer and seconder. The proposer and seconder must attend in person the Electoral Assembly ("nomination meeting") held at the Parish Hall of St Helier, presided over by the Comité des Connétables, and the proposer must read out publicly the nomination form, including the candidate's declaration of criminal convictions (or of no criminal convictions).

If more candidates are nominated than there are seats available, a poll is declared, to be taken on the date set by the Royal Court. If there are no more candidates nominated after 20 minutes than available seats, then the candidates are declared elected unopposed and no poll is taken. The Royal Court appoints an autorisé for each constituency to oversee the poll (usually, but not exclusively, a Jurat or Crown Officer). Results for each parish on polling day are declared by the autorisé.

In the October 2011 elections, four senatorial seats were contested, each voter having a maximum of four unranked votes in a first past the post bloc voting system (multi-member plurality system). In the October 2014 elections, each voter had eight unranked votes for Senator.

Deputies
The procedure for nomination for Deputy follows the same pattern as for the Senatorials, except that the nomination paper must be signed by 10 voters, including proposer and seconder, validly registered in the constituency in which they intend standing (for a Senatorial election, the constituency is one all-Island constituency). The proposer and seconder must attend in person the Electoral Assembly ("nomination meeting") presided by the Constable (or Chef de Police or Procureur du Bien Public) of the respective parish held at the respective parish's parish hall (Public Hall in the case of St. Martin) or other place as may be specified.

In the case of parishes divided into more than one electoral district, nominations are accepted at the Electoral Assembly by district, nominations for each district having to last at least 20 minutes. (see articles on individual parishes for electoral districts)

In single-member districts, a simple first past the post election is held. In multi-member districts, the system is that of a first past the post bloc election analogous to the Senatorials.

Past elections
 1993 Jersey general election
 1996 Jersey general election
 1999 Jersey general election
 2002 Jersey general election
 2005 Jersey general election
 2008 Jersey general election
 2011 Jersey general election
 2014 Jersey general election
 2018 Jersey general election
 2022 Jersey general election

By-elections
For senators:
1999 Jersey by-elections
2003 Jersey by-elections
2004 Jersey by-elections
2010 Jersey by-elections
2016 Jersey by-election

For deputies:
1999 Jersey by-elections
2000 Jersey by-elections
2014 Jersey by-elections

Local elections

The first local election on the island was a one-off event in 1940. The elected Connétable (or "Constable") heads the administration of each of the twelve parishes.

Procureurs du Bien Public and Centeniers are elected under the same rules as Senators, Deputies and Constables.

Centeniers, Vingteniers and Constable's Officers, collectively the Honorary Police are elected by a Parish assembly along with members of the Roads Committee and Roads Inspectors and must take an oath of office before the Royal Court.

Other municipal officials are also elected by an Assembly of Electors but are not subject to an oath of office.

Changes to the Voting Law meant that all elections for the position of Procureur du Bien Public and Centenier now follow the rule applied to elections to the States of Jersey. Since such elections are generally uncontested the following list details contested elections only. A full list of people elected to Parish Municipalities can be found at List of politicians in Jersey.

2006 Jersey regional elections
2007 Jersey regional elections
2008 Jersey regional elections

Constable elections are normally for a period of three years. From 2008, all Constables will be elected on a single day, all terms will be cut short to allow for this  Thus all elections in 2006 and 2007 are for a period until that date.

2001 Jersey constable election
2002 Jersey constable election
2003 Jersey constable election
2004 Jersey constable election
2005 Jersey constable election
2006 Jersey constable election
2007 Jersey constable election
2008 Jersey constable election

Electoral register
Those eligible to vote at a public election (for Senators, Deputies, Constables, Procureurs du Bien Public and Centeniers) are those whose names are included on the electoral register for the relevant electoral district (the register is compiled by vingtaine).

Those entitled to register must be 
at least 16 years old (lowered from 18 in 2008);
ordinarily resident in the relevant electoral district;
and either 
ordinarily resident in Jersey for the period of at least two years prior to registration; or
ordinarily resident in Jersey for a period of at least six months up to and including that day, as well as having completed a total of at least five years of ordinary residency in Jersey at some foregoing period.

The right to vote is determined by residency, not citizenship, and therefore citizens of any state may vote in Jersey elections provided they fulfill the other requirements for electoral registration.

On 4 July 2007, the States of Jersey voted to reduce voting age to 16. The law was brought into force on 12 March 2008, with effect from 1 April 2008, allowing  16- and 17-year-old voters to register in time for the 2008 elections.

Those entitled to vote at elections other than public elections are electors, ratepayers and mandataires.

The first public election by secret ballot was held on 1 December 1891, following the passing of the law providing for secret ballots on 26 January 1891. Secret ballots are not required for other elections (at Parish Assemblies) and may be conducted by show of hands, although such elections may be conducted by means of secret ballot.

Indirect elections
Since the 1948 constitutional reforms, Jurats are elected by electoral college rather than by Islandwide vote.

See also
 Politics of Jersey
 Electoral calendar
 Electoral system

References

External links
Voter registration and information on vote.je
Election information on Government of Jersey website